Events of 2012 in Spain.

Incumbents 
 Monarch - Juan Carlos I
 Prime Minister - Mariano Rajoy

Notable events 

 13 May - Pastor Maldonado wins the Spanish Grand Prix, marking him the first Venezuelan Formula One driver to win a race.

 1 July - Spain's national team wins UEFA Euro Final in Kyiv, Ukraine. 
11 September - Some 1.5 million people take part in Catalonia's annual independence rally in Barcelona.

Deaths 
 2 April – Pilar Fuertes Ferragut, 49, diplomat, road accident.

See also 
 2012 in Spanish television
 List of Spanish films of 2012

References